Sirenik Yupik, Sireniki Yupik (also Old Sirenik or Vuteen), Sirenik, or Sirenikskiy is an extinct Eskimo–Aleut language. It was spoken in and around the village of Sireniki (Сиреники) in Chukotka Peninsula, Chukotka Autonomous Okrug, Russia. The language shift has been a long process, ending in total language death. In January 1997, the last native speaker of the language, a woman named Vyjye (Valentina Wye), died. Ever since that point, the language has been extinct; nowadays, all Sirenik Eskimos speak Siberian Yupik or Russian.

Сиӷы́ных  is the endonym for the eponymous settlement of Sireniki. The endonym for the people itself is сиӷы́ныгмы̄́ӷий  "Sirenikites"; the singular form is сиӷы́ныгмы̄́ӷа ).

This article is based on Menovschikov (1964), with cited examples transliterated from Cyrillic transcription to the International Phonetic Alphabet.

Classification

Genealogical

External 
Some argue that the Sirenik language is a remnant of a third group of Eskimo languages, in addition to Yupik and Inuit groups (see a visual representation by tree and an argumentation based on comparative linguistics). In fact, the exact genealogical classification of Sireniki language is not settled yet, and some others regard it belonging to the Yupik branch.

Many words are formed from entirely different roots to those in Siberian Yupik. Also, the grammar has several peculiarities compared to other Eskimo languages, and even compared to Aleut. For example, dual number is not known in Sireniki Eskimo, while most Eskimo–Aleut languages have dual, including even its neighboring Siberian Yupik relatives. The peculiarities amounted to mutual unintelligibility with even its nearest language relatives. This forced Sirenik Eskimos to use Chukchi as a lingua franca when speaking with neighboring Eskimo peoples. Thus, any external contacts required using a different language for Sireniki Eskimos: they either resorted to use of lingua franca, or used Siberian Yupik languages (being definitely a mutually unintelligible, different language for them, not just a dialect of their own). This difference from all their language relatives may be the result of a supposed long isolation from other Eskimo groups: Sireniki Eskimos may have been in contact only with speakers of unrelated languages for many centuries in the past, influenced especially by non-relative Chukchi.

Internal 

Although the number of its speakers was very few even at the end of the nineteenth century, the language had at least two dialects in the past.

Typological 

As for its morphological typology, it has polysynthetic and incorporative features (just like the other Eskimo languages).

Phonology

Consonants 

 Some consonants can be palatalized, e.g.: .

Vowels

Morphology 

Like all other Eskimo languages, the morphology is rather complex. A description grouped by lexical categories follows.

Nominal and verbal 

Although morphology will be treated grouped into a nominal and a verbal part, many Eskimo languages show features which “crosscut” any such groupings in several aspects:
 the ergative structure at verbs is similar to the possessive structure at nouns (see section #Ergative–absolutive);
 a physical similarity exists between nominal and verbal personal suffix paradigms, i.e., in most cases, the respective person-number is expressed with the same sequence of phonemes at:
 possessive suffixes (at nouns)
 verbal suffixes;
 nomenverbum-like roots, becoming nominal or verbal only via the suffix they get;
 Eskimo texts abound in various kinds of participles (see section #Participles);

Common grammatical categories 

Some grammatical categories (e.g. person and number) are applicable to both verbal and nominal lexical categories.

Although person and number are expressed in a single suffix, sometimes it can be traced back to consist of a distinct person and a distinct number suffix.

Person 

Paradigms can make a distinction in 3rd person for “self”, thus the mere personal suffix (of the verb or noun) can distinguish e.g.
a nominal example
“He/she takes his/her own dog” versus “He/she takes the dog of another person”.
a verbal example
“He/she sees himself/herself” versus “He/she sees him/her (another person)”

Thus, it can be translated into English (and some other languages) using a reflexive pronoun. This notion concerns also other concepts in building larger parts of the sentence and the text, see section #Usage of third person suffixes.

Number 

Although other Eskimo languages know more than the familiar two grammatical numbers (by having also dual), Sireniki uses only singular and plural, thus it lacks dual. As mentioned, Sireniki is peculiar in this aspect not only among Eskimo languages, but even in the entire Eskimo–Aleut language family, even its neighboring Siberian Yupik relatives have dual.

Building verbs from nouns 

Suffix -- meaning “to be similar to sth”:

Predicative form of a noun 

Predicative form of a noun can be built using suffix --:

Verbs built from toponyms 

  (a toponym: Imtuk)
  (I travel to Imtuk.)

Nominal lexical categories

Grammatical categories 

Not only the grammatical cases of nouns are marked by suffixes, but also the person of possessor (use of possessive pronouns in English) can be expressed by agglutination.

It is just an excerpt for illustration: not all cases are shown, Sirenik language has more grammatical cases. The table illustrates also why Sirenik language is treated as agglutinative (rather than fusional).

There is no grammatical gender (or gender-like noun class system).

Case 
Sireniki is an absolutive–ergative language.

Cases (listed using Menovščikov's numbering):
 Absolutive
 Relative case, playing the role of both genitive case and ergative case.
 Ablative / Instrumental, used also in accusative structures.
 Dative / Lative
 Locative
 Vialis case, see also Prosecutive case, and "motion via"
 Equative (comparative)

To see why a single case can play such distinct roles at all, read morphosyntactic alignment, and also a short table about it.

Some finer grammatical functions are expressed using postpositions. Most of them are built as a combinations of cases
 lative or locative or ablative
 combined with relative (used as genitive)
in a similar way as we use expressions like "on top of" in English.

Verbal lexical categories 
Also at verbs, the morphology is very rich. Suffixes can express grammatical moods of the verb (e.g. imperative, interrogative, optative), and also negation, tense, aspect, the person of subject and object. Some examples (far from being comprehensive):

The rich set of morphemes makes it possible to build huge verbs whose meaning could be expressed (in most of widely known languages) as whole sentences (consisting of more words) . Sireniki – like the other Eskimo languages – has polysynthetic and incorporative features, in many forms, among others polypersonal agreement.

Grammatical categories 

The polysynthetic and incorporative features mentioned above manifest themselves in most of the ways Sirenik language can express grammatical categories.

Transitivity 

For background, see transitivity. (Remember also section #Ergative–absolutive.)

See also.

Polarity 

Even the grammatical polarity can be expressed by adding a suffix to the verb.

An example for negative polarity: the negation form of the verb  (to go):
  (the man walks)
  (the man does not walk)

Aspect 

Grammatical aspect:

Modality 

Also linguistic modality can be expressed by suffixes. Modal verbs like "want to", "wish to" etc. do not even exist:

The table illustrates also why Sirenik is treated as agglutinative (rather than fusional).

Voice 

Four grammatical voices are mentioned in:
active
passive
confer  that variant of Siberian Yupik which is spoken by Ungazigmit
middle (medial)
causative
 (Malika makes Kitugi go to the reindeer.)
all of them are expressed by agglutination, thus, no separate words are required.

Participles 

A distinction between two kinds of participles (adverbial participle and adjectival participle) makes sense in Sireniki (just like in Hungarian, see határozói igenév and melléknévi igenév for detailed description of these concepts; or in Russian, see деепричастие and причастие).

Sireniki has many kinds of participles in both categories. In the following, they will be listed, grouped by the relation between the “dependent action” and “main action” (or by other meanings beyond this, e.g. modality) – following the terminology of. A sentence with a participle can be imagined as simulating a subordinating compound sentence where the action described in the dependent clause relates somehow to the action described in the main clause. In English, an adverbial clause may express reason, purpose, condition, succession etc., and a relative clause can express many meanings, too.

In an analogous way, in Sireniki Eskimo language, the "dependent action" (expressed by the adverbial participle in the sentence element called adverbial, or expressed by the adjectival participle in the sentence element called attribute) relates somehow to the “main action” (expressed by the verb in the sentence element called predicate), and the participles will be listed below grouped by this relation (or by other meanings beyond this, e.g. modality).

Adverbial participles 

They can be translated into English e.g. by using an appropriate adverbial clause. There are many of them, with various meanings.

An interesting feature: they can have person and number. The person of the dependent action need not coincide with that of the main action. An example (meant in the British English usage of “shall / should” in the 1st person: here, conveying only conditional, but no necessity or morality):

Another example (with a different adverbial participle):

They will be discussed in more details below.

Reason, purpose or circumstance of action 

An adverbial participle “explaining reason, purpose or circumstance of action” is expressed by suffix -- / -- (followed by appropriate person-number suffix). Examples:

Another example, with a somewhat different usage:

Dependent action ends just before main action begins 

Using the adverbial participle -- / --, the dependent action (expressed by the adverbial participle in the sentence element called adverbial) finishes just before the main action (expressed by the verb in the sentence element called predicate) begins.

Dependent action begins before main action, but they continue together till end 

It can be expressed by suffix --. Examples:

where

Another example:

Conditional 

Dependent action is conditional: it does not takes place, although it would (either really, or provided that some—maybe irreal—conditions would hold). Confer also conditional sentence.

Sireniki Eskimo has several adverbial participles to express that. We can distinguish them according to the concerned condition (conveyed by the dependent action): it may be
 either real (possible to take place in the future)
 or irreal (it would take place only if some other irreal condition would hold)

Real 

Irreal 
Confer counterfactual conditional. Sireniki can compress it into an adverbial participle: it is expressed with suffix -- / --.

The dependent action is expressed with an adverbial participle. The main action is conveyed by the verb. If also the main action is conditional (a typical usage), than it can be expressed with a verb of conditional mood. The persons need not coincide.

An example (meant in the British English usage of “shall / should” in the 1st person: here, conveying only conditional, but no necessity or morality):

The example in details:

Dependent action:

Adjectival participles 

There are more kinds of them.
  (The sledge [that went to Imtuk] returned.)
  (I saw [perceived] a sleeping man.)
They can be used not only in attributive role (as in the above examples), but also in predicative role:
  (The man is sleeping.)

Modality 

Adjectival participle - / - conveys a meaning related rather to modality (than to the relation of dependent action and main action). It conveys meaning “able to”.
  (A child who is able to walk moves around spontaneously)

Syntax

Ergative–absolutive 

Sireniki is (just like many Eskimo languages) an ergative–absolutive language. For English-language materials treating this feature of Sireniki, see Vakhtin's book, or see online a paper treating a relative Eskimo language.

Usage of third person suffixes 

Although the below examples are taken from Inuit Eskimo languages (Kalaallisut), but e.g. Sireniki's distinguishing between two kinds of 3rd person suffixes can be concerned, too (remember section #Person above: there is a distinct reflexive (“own”-like) and an “another person”-like 3rd person suffix).

Topic–comment 

For a detailed theoretical treatment concerning the notions of topic (and anaphora, and binding), with Eskimo-related examples, see online Maria Bittner's works, especially.

Obviation 

For a treatment of obviation in (among others) Eskimo languages, see online and in more details (also online) from the same authors.

Word order 

See also.

See also 

 Siberian Yupik
 Eskimo
 Ergative–absolutive language
 Transitive verb
 Intransitive verb
 Polysynthetic language
 Incorporation (linguistics)
 Language death

Notes

References

English

Russian 

  The transliteration of author's name, and the rendering of title in English: 
  The transliteration of author's name, and the rendering of title in English: 
 
  The transliteration of author's name, and the rendering of title in English:

External links 
  (Languages of the world – Paleoasian languages.)
 
 

Agglutinative languages
Languages of Russia
Eskaleut languages
Extinct languages of Asia
Siberian Yupik
Languages extinct in the 20th century